Dreibelbis may refer to:

Dreibelbis, Pennsylvania, an unincorporated community in Berks County, Pennsylvania, United States
Galen Dreibelbis (born 1935), American politician

See also
Dreibelbis Mill, a historic grist mill in Berks County, Pennsylvania, United States